George Harris (1875 – 1910) was an English professional footballer who played as a goalkeeper.

References

1875 births
1910 deaths
Sportspeople from Redditch
English footballers
Association football goalkeepers
Aston Villa F.C. players
Wolverhampton Wanderers F.C. players
Grimsby Town F.C. players
Portsmouth F.C. players
Tunbridge Wells F.C. players
Kidderminster Harriers F.C. players
English Football League players